Chen Han-tung (born 5 December 1980) is a Taiwanese weightlifter, competing in the 48 kg category and representing Chinese Taipei at international competitions. 

She participated at the 2004 Summer Olympics in the 48 kg event. She competed at world championships, most recently at the 2005 World Weightlifting Championships.

Major results

References

External links
 

1980 births
Living people
Taiwanese female weightlifters
Weightlifters at the 2004 Summer Olympics
Olympic weightlifters of Taiwan
Place of birth missing (living people)
World Weightlifting Championships medalists
Weightlifters at the 2002 Asian Games
Asian Games competitors for Chinese Taipei
21st-century Taiwanese women